The Nome Gold Rush was a gold rush in Nome, Alaska, approximately 1899–1909. It is separated from other gold rushes by the ease with which gold could be obtained. Much of the gold was lying in the beach sand of the landing place and could be recovered without any need for a claim. Nome was a sea port without a harbor, and the biggest town in Alaska.

Together with the Klondike Gold Rush (1896–1899) and Fairbanks Gold Rush (1903–1911), Nome was among the biggest gold rushes north of 60 degrees latitude on the North American continent. It shared prospectors with both Klondike and later rushes like Fairbanks. It is memorialized in films like North to Alaska. Nome City still exists and the area is mined as Nome mining district and by tourists. Total production of gold from the area is estimated to be 112 metric tons.

History

Prehistory
The center of the Nome Gold Rush was the town of Nome at the outlet of Snake River on the Seward Peninsula at Norton Sound of the Bering Sea. The Iñupiat had camped for centuries in the Nome area before Russians came. In the 18th century, they established the port of St. Michael, 125 miles to the southeast, for sailing on the Yukon River. Fur traders and whalers from many countries visited the area. A few church missions were established beginning in the 1880s. Gold was found in smaller amounts at Council 1897, the year before Nome, and subsequently other places in the area.

Discovery

In September 1898, the "Three Lucky Swedes": Norwegian-American Jafet Lindeberg, and two American citizens of Swedish birth, Erik Lindblom and John Brynteson, discovered gold on Anvil Creek and founded Nome mining district. News of the discovery reached the outside world that winter. By 1899, Nome had a population of 10,000 many of whom had arrived from the Klondike gold rush area. In that year, gold was found in the beach sands for dozens of miles along the coast at Nome, which spurred the stampede to new heights. Thousands more people poured into Nome during the spring of 1900 aboard steamships from the ports of Seattle and San Francisco. More gold seekers from the distant city of Adelaide, Australia set out for Nome aboard the schooner Inca in 1902. By 1900, a tent city on the beaches and on the treeless coast reached 30 miles, from Cape Rodney to Cape Nome.

Claim jumping
Many late-comers were jealous of the original discoverers, and tried to "jump" the original claims by filing claims covering the same ground. The federal judge for the area ruled the original claims valid, but some of the claim jumpers agreed to share their invalid claims with influential U.S. politicians. One of these, Alexander McKenzie, a Republican from North Dakota, took interest in the gold rush and seized mining claims with the help of a crooked judge, Arthur H. Noyes. Mckenzie's claim-jumping scheme was eventually stopped by the federal Ninth Circuit Court of Appeals; however, the episode provided the plot for Rex Beach's best-selling novel The Spoilers (1906), which was made into a stage play and movies, most famously The Spoilers (1942) starring John Wayne. Because of the unrest Fort Davis was established 1900 at the mouth of Nome River, 4 miles east of Nome City.

Mining at Nome

Beach
Claim jumping was mostly a problem before the beach gold was found, since it could not be claimed and there was plenty of it. As a matter of fact, the beach gold seems to have been more important than the claimed gold in the creeks. The mining of Nome beach is a good example of gold rushes going through phases of increasing use of machinery and capital. The very first gold on the beach was found with a pan. Later in the summer of 1899 human powered equipment like sluices and rockers were present. In 1900 small machines together with hoses and pumps were seen at the beach, and finally from around 1902 big companies took over. The season wasn't long. Due to ice, the beaches could only be worked from June to October. Local police forced people with inadequate shelter to leave for the winter.

Creeks
Panning creeks for gold in Alaska is slow and cold. As in Klondike there was a layer of permafrost just below the surface. In Nome different kinds of equipment were used to thaw the ground and suck up gravel. The mining methods used were extensive meaning that the amount of soil processed was more important than the efficiency of the equipment that separated gold from sand. By hydraulic methods soil was washed off the creek banks and into sluices either by gravity or suction. Dredges and in some cases mine shafts were used. To facilitate digging the ground was softened with steam. Steam was also used for collecting dumps of gravel in the winter. The gravel was sluiced the next summer.

Nome City

By 1905 Nome had schools, churches, newspapers, a hospital, saloons, stores, and a post office, an electric light plant and other businesses. A hothouse on the sand-spit across the Snake River provided fresh vegetables. Some of the first automobiles in Alaska ran on the planks of Front Street. Travelers going to the mines at Council City rode in heated stages. In 1904 the first wireless telegraph in the United States to transmit over a distance of more than 100 miles began operating in Nome. Messages could be sent from Nome to St. Michael and from there by cable to Seattle.

Nome had no harbor for ships during the rush, only one for local boats. Ships anchored offshore and people were shuttled ashore in boats. In early summer the coast could still be covered with ice. In that case passengers would be put off on the ice and brought ashore by dog sledges. In 1901 a loading crane was built and in 1905 a wharf. This was by 1907 replaced by or combined with a tramway. Together with the tramway, which was 1,400 feet long, people and freight were brought ashore by wire-pulled lighters.

End of the Rush
In 1904 and 1905, gold was found in old beaches above the high-tide mark. The discovery of a second and then a third beach renewed mining close to Nome. These strikes, however, were short-lived. Between 1900–1909 Nome's estimated population reached as high as 20,000; in the census of 1909 the population at Nome had dropped to 2600. The rush was over, but gold mining continues to the present (2015) and every year prospectors arrive to look for gold. Total gold production for the Nome district is at least 3.6 million ounces or 111.6 metric tonnes.

Financial results
Among the Nome prospectors at least the three "Three Lucky Swedes" made a fortune. Around 1920 their mining company had made $20,000,000. An attempt to calculate how much the average beach prospector earned in 1899 gives the following figure: Estimate of gold value recovered: $2,000,000, annual wage for a worker: $400, number of prospectors: 2,000. This yields 2.5-year of salary worth for each person. Also, saloon owners and other service providers made money during the rush. An example is Wyatt Earp, who is estimated to have returned from Nome with $80,000. A well-known prospector, Swiftwater Bill Gates, made a fortune in both Klondike and Nome, but lost everything just as quickly.

Effect on Native people and nature
The people most affected were probably the natives. Mining claims could only be staked lawfully by citizens. Since natives were considered to be uncivilized, they could not get citizenship. For them, the gold rush meant a drastic reduction in moose, caribou, and small game as prospectors hunted these for food. In many areas, gold mining resulted in destruction of salmon streams. Contact with white men also had consequences like drinking and disease.

Legacy

The original claim sites of the "Three Lucky Swedes" were listed on the National Register of Historic Places in 1976 (as "Anvil Creek Gold Discovery Site", "Erik Lindblom Placer Claim", and "Snow Creek Placer Claim No. 1").  In 1978, these three places, plus a fourth critical to the gold rush, were designated a National Historic Landmark District, Cape Nome Mining District Discovery Sites.  The fourth site is a  stretch of the beach on the eastern edge of the city, extending from the seawall to East Limit Road.

Nome and Klondike
The legacy of the Nome gold rush is somewhat obscured by the fame of Klondike. The two gold rushes, however, should not be confused. Both Klondike and Nome are often thought of as Alaska gold rushes, even though only Nome is actually in Alaska. The center of the Klondike gold rush was near Dawson City in the Yukon Territory, Canada and therefore outside Alaska, but the two locations are connected by the Yukon River, which has its headwaters in northern British Columbia, Canada, and eventually flows through the Yukon Territory into Alaska. Klondike River giving name to the rush is a tributary of the Yukon River, which runs through Alaska and ends in Norton Sound opposite Nome. For that reason, Yukon River too is associated with both rushes. As mentioned earlier, there was an overlap of prospectors between Klondike and Nome and, finally, the two rushes shared some of the same routes.

Film
Apart from the novel and the films The Spoilers filmed in 1955 with Jeff Chandler, 1942 with John Wayne, 1930 with Gary Cooper, and 1914 with William Farnum, and also North to Alaska (1960 comedy, starring John Wayne as well and also known for its theme song) is set in Nome during the rush. In Wyatt Earp (1993 western based on the life of Wyatt Earp, starring Kevin Costner) a scene in the end refers briefly to Nome.

See also

 List of National Historic Landmarks in Alaska
 National Register of Historic Places listings in Nome Census Area, Alaska

Notes

References

1890s in Alaska
1900s in Alaska
1899 in Alaska
1909 in Alaska
Alaskan gold rushes
Histories of cities in Alaska
Nome, Alaska
Klondike Gold Rush